In mathematics, the prime signature of a number is the multiset of (nonzero) exponents of its prime factorization. The prime signature of a number having prime factorization  is the multiset .

For example, all prime numbers have a prime signature of {1}, the squares of primes have a prime signature of {2}, the products of 2 distinct primes have a prime signature of } and the products of a square of a prime and a different prime (e.g. 12, 18, 20, ...) have a prime signature of }.

Properties 

The divisor function τ(n), the Möbius function μ(n), the number of distinct prime divisors ω(n) of n, the number of prime divisors Ω(n) of n, the indicator function of the squarefree integers, and many other important functions in number theory, are functions of the prime signature of n.

In particular, τ(n) equals the product of the incremented by 1 exponents from the prime signature of n. 
For example, 20 has prime signature {2,1} and so the number of divisors is (2+1) × (1+1) = 6. Indeed, there are six divisors: 1, 2, 4, 5, 10 and 20.

The smallest number of each prime signature is a product of primorials. The first few are:
1, 2, 4, 6, 8, 12, 16, 24, 30, 32, 36, 48, 60, 64, 72, 96, 120, 128, 144, 180, 192, 210, 216, ... .

A number cannot divide another unless its prime signature is included in the other numbers prime signature in the Young's lattice.

Numbers with same prime signature

Sequences defined by their prime signature 
Given a number with prime signature S, it is
 A prime number if S = {1},
 A square if gcd S is even,
 A square-free integer if max S = 1,
 A cube-free integer if max S ≤ 2,
 A powerful number if min S ≥ 2,
 An Achilles number if min S ≥ 2 and gcd S = 1,
 k-almost prime if sum S = k.

See also
 Canonical representation of a positive integer

References

External links
List of the first 400 prime signatures
Iterative Mapping of Prime Signatures

Number theory
Prime numbers